This is a list of properties and districts in the southern municipalities of Puerto Rico that are listed on the National Register of Historic Places. It includes places along the southern coast of the island, and on the south slope of Puerto Rico's Cordillera Central.

The area covered spans from the city of Yauco on the southwest coast to the Guayama municipality at the southeast.

Names of places given are as they appear in the National Register, reflecting name as given in NRHP application at the date of listing. Note, the National Register name system does not accommodate Spanish á, ñ and other letters.

Guayama

|}

Guayanilla

|}

Juana Díaz

|}

Peñuelas

|}

Ponce

|}

Salinas

|}

Santa Isabel

|}

Yauco

|}

See also

National Register of Historic Places listings in Puerto Rico
National Register of Historic Places listings in northern Puerto Rico
National Register of Historic Places listings in western Puerto Rico
National Register of Historic Places listings in central Puerto Rico
National Register of Historic Places listings in eastern Puerto Rico
National Register of Historic Places listings in San Juan, Puerto Rico
Historic preservation
History of Puerto Rico

Notes

References

External links
Puerto Rico State Historic Preservation Office, National Register of Historic Places site
National Park Service, National Register of Historic Places site

External sources 
National Park Service, announcements of National Register entries and other actions, annual beginning 1979, weekly after 1982, individual releases under various titles.
.
. (See also technical information at Download Center, section "All Data".)
.
.
Nomination/registration documentation for individual National Register entries, various authors and dates, available online variously through:
.
National Park Service, NPS Focus, op. cit.
Oficina Estatal de Conservación Histórica, online GIS, op. cit.

Southern